ADOC may refer to:
 Air Defense Operations Center (NORAD), a military facility command and control center
 Air Defense Center Kindsbach, ADOC Kindsbach near Ramstein Air Base, Germany
 Alabama Department of Corrections
 Empresas ADOC
 A common file extension for AsciiDoc markup language files